Kent Anderson (born August 20, 1945) is an American author, Vietnam War veteran, former police officer and former university professor born in 1945 in North Carolina. He has written novels, various articles and scenarios.

Life 

Kent Anderson is an American writer and screenwriter, born in North Carolina August 20, 1946. Anderson is best known for his series of books based on his experiences as a Viet Nam era Green Beret and a police officer in two major American cities.

He is a former merchant seaman, decorated Vietnam War veteran, former police officer, former university English professor and current writer and essayist.  He has written novels, magazine articles, non-fiction, and screenplays.

Kent Anderson grew up in North Carolina. At age 19 he joined the Merchant Marine as an Ordinary Seaman and worked as a deck hand for two years on merchant ships traveling both the Atlantic and Pacific Oceans.

He then attended the University of North Carolina at Greensboro for two years before he received his draft notice and then enlisted in the US Army the next day. He went through Special Forces (“Green Beret”) training and was sent to Vietnam and assigned to Special Forces camp A-101 Mai Loc from 1969 to 1970.  He was awarded the combat infantryman’s badge and two bronze star medals.

After returning from Vietnam he completed his English BA, and then, unable to find work for over a year, joined the Portland, Oregon Police Bureau, where he worked as a patrolman from 1972 to 1976.  He received the first of two NEA creative writing fellowships in 1976, took a two-year leave of absence from the Portland Police, and earned a Master of Fine Arts in Fiction writing at the University of Montana in 1978. Anderson then resigned from the police. He worked again as a police patrolman, in Oakland, California, in 1982 and 1983, before resigning to write his first novel, Sympathy for the Devil, about a young Special Forces soldier in the Vietnam War known only as “Hanson.” 

Hanson is the protagonist of all three of Anderson’s novels, grown older and, as the result of his accumulated experience, seeing the world, and himself, differently in each book.  Each novel of the trilogy easily stands on its own, and while the books are strongly autobiographical, Anderson presents them as novels.

Anderson was a visiting writer at the University of Texas El Paso (UTEP) in El Paso, Texas until 1986. He moved to Los Angeles and began teaching creative writing at UCLA and then became a protégé of John Milius, a screenwriter, producer and director involved with such films as “Jeremiah Johnson,” “Apocalypse Now,” “Conan The Barbarian” and “Red Dawn.”  Anderson spent four years writing screenplays for New Line Cinema and won a second NEA creative writing fellowship in 1987.

Anderson left Hollywood to work as a tenure-track assistant professor at Boise State University, (BSU) in Boise, Idaho, where he finished his second novel, Night Dogs, about his time as a police officer in Portland, Oregon. Night Dogs was selected by the New York Times as a Notable Book of the Year for 1998. and the French edition, Chiens de la Nuit, won the “Prix Calibre 38.” prize for best novel that same year. The following year he published Liquor, Guns & Ammo, a collection of autobiographical non-fiction. Liquor, Guns & Ammo. Dennis McMillan Publications. 1998. 

While living in Santa Fe, New Mexico, he published a collection of non-fiction pieces, Pas de Saison Pour L’enfer, (No Season For Hell) in France, and in 2018 published "Green Sun," a novel about his work as a police patrolman in Oakland, California.

"Green Sun" was one of five finalists for the Los Angeles Times Book Prize in 2018. The French edition, Un Soleil Sans Espoir, was awarded the 2019 “Grand Prix du Roman noir etranger de Beaune,” and the 2019 “Grand Prix de Litterature Policiere,” two of the most prestigious award given for crime and detective fiction in France. Kent Anderson was the Guest of Honor in 2019 at the “Festival International du Roman Noir” de Frontignan, France.
 
Anderson currently lives in Medanales, New Mexico, on a horse ranch along the Chama River, where he is at work on a memoir about the years he spent with wild and half-wild horses in central Idaho.

Works 
 Sympathy for the Devil. Doubleday. 1987. 
 Night Dogs. Dennis McMillan Publications. 1996. 
 Liquor, Guns & Ammo. Dennis McMillan Publications. 1998. 
 Green Sun. Mulholland Books. 2018.

References

External links
 

1945 births
20th-century American novelists
21st-century American novelists
United States Army personnel of the Vietnam War
American male novelists
American male screenwriters
Members of the United States Army Special Forces
University of North Carolina at Greensboro alumni
University of Montana alumni
Portland Police Bureau officers
University of Texas at El Paso faculty
Living people
United States Army soldiers
Novelists from Texas
United States Merchant Mariners
20th-century American male writers
21st-century American male writers